Shinobi Legions, known as Shinobi X in Europe and as  in Japan, is an action game in the Shinobi series developed by TOSE and published by Sega in 1995 for Sega Saturn.

Gameplay
Shinobi Legions is a traditional side-scrolling  action game. The protagonist ninja Sho comes across various foes and obstacles that test the player's skill, including boss encounters. The gameplay itself is largely the same as that in Shinobi III: Return of the Ninja Master. However in this game special emphasis lies on the use of Sho's katana instead of his shuriken, as separate buttons are now used to control them.

The four ninjutsu techniques from earlier Shinobi games have also disappeared. Instead, Sho gains his special abilities by picking up various items scattered across each level. Among them are simple power-ups (yellow and red orbs to restore his hit points) or temporary ninjutsu abilities, such as the Great Sword or the Bunshin clone shield against enemy attacks.

In each level blue orbs called life spheres can be found. Every time the player collects ten of them, Sho gains one life. Some item crates contain bombs that will damage Sho if he is standing too near.

Plot
Years of civil war have brought the ninjutsu code and its warriors to the brink of extinction. A ninjutsu master selects three children to carry on the ninja traditions for the next generation: two brothers, Kazuma and Sho, and his own daughter Aya. He begins to train them.

Fifteen years pass. The oldest boy, Kazuma, begins to reject all the ninjutsu teachings, save for the technique of strength. Obsessed with power, Kazuma demands that the master teach him the ultimate technique. The master refuses, and Kazuma vows to return one day and take revenge. Sho and Aya continue their studies and master the ninjutsu teachings.

Kazuma returns with an army and the resources to build a fortress. Although the old master has died, his pupils contain the secrets of the ultimate technique. Kazuma sets up a trap to lure Sho into his hideout, and kidnaps Aya to use her as a bait.

In the ending, Kazuma sacrifices himself to save Aya and Sho from an explosion.

Shinobi X

The European version of Shinobi Legions, published by Sega Europe and released as Shinobi X (a revert to the game's original title from when it was first announced at the Tokyo Toy Show in June 1994), was delayed and released in late 1995. It was delayed because Sega Europe's producer David Nulty disliked the original music score and wanted to change it for the European release, in a similar way that Sega of America did years before with the North American release of Sonic CD.

The in-game tracks were replaced by British video game composer Richard Jacques, while the cutscene music tracks were left intact. Jacques composed the soundtrack in imitation of the style of Yuzo Koshiro's The Revenge of Shinobi. The North American version, published earlier the same year by Vic Tokai, had retained the same music as the Japanese version.

Reception

On release, Famicom Tsūshin scored the game a 26 out of 40. GamePro gave it a rave review, stating that "If you've been sitting on the fence regarding a Sega Saturn purchase, here's a swift shuriken in the butt to get you moving." They particularly praised the new defensive moves and greater variety of enemies compared to previous Shinobi games. They also felt that the digitized sprite-based graphics were a refreshing change from the polygon-based graphics used in most Saturn games. The four reviewers of Electronic Gaming Monthly likewise praised the new defensive moves and "fluid" graphics. They had varying reactions to the FMV cutscenes, and two of the reviewers felt the game lacked the "feel" of earlier Shinobi games, but all four agreed that the game was both visually impressive and fun to play. A critic for Next Generation, while remarking that the game made no real advance in gameplay over its last generation predecessors, argued that it also maintains the standard of excellent gameplay set by those predecessors, and that the greater sophistication in the graphics would likely be enough to appease fans of the Shinobi series. Sega Saturn Magazine said that it plays well but fails to make any real use of the Saturn's capabilities, calling it "another Shinobi game that somehow managed to find its way on to CD instead of cartridge." They suggested that the "tacky" FMV scenes were added simply as an excuse to release the game on the Saturn instead of the Sega Genesis. A reviewer for Maximum described it as "a disappointment" compared to the earlier Shinobi games, but did not provide any specifics.

References

External links

Hardcore Gaming 101: Shinobi

1995 video games
Dinosaurs in video games
Science fantasy video games
Sega video games
Sega Saturn games
Sega Saturn-only games
Shinobi (series)
Side-scrolling video games
Vic Tokai games
Video games scored by Richard Jacques
Video games set in Hong Kong
Video games set in Japan
Video games with digitized sprites
Video games developed in Japan